Saša Radivojević (born 10 April 1979) is a Serbian football goalkeeper. He last played for Indonesia Super League club Pelita Jaya.

Career
Before moving to Red Star he played for FK Radnički Beograd, FK Zeta, Pegah Gilan, Apollon Kalamarias, FK Borac Čačak and FK Čukarički.

Radivojević was signed by Red Star in order to secure the goalkeeper position at the club after Vladimir Stojković's departure to Nantes. He is currently the substitute goalkeeper. With Red Star he won national championship (2007) and Serbian Cup (2007).

For the second part of the 2007–08 season, he was loaned to FK Borac Čačak and also the second part of the 2009–10 season, he was loaned to FK Čukarički.

External links
 Profile at Srbijafudbal
 Saša Radivojević Stats at Utakmica.rs

1979 births
Living people
Footballers from Belgrade
Serbian footballers
Association football goalkeepers
FK Partizan players
FK Radnički Beograd players
Red Star Belgrade footballers
FK Borac Čačak players
FK Čukarički players
Serbian SuperLiga players
FK Zeta players
Pegah Gilan players
Pelita Bandung Raya players
Expatriate footballers in Iran
Expatriate footballers in Indonesia
Apollon Pontou FC players
Expatriate footballers in Greece